Farhad Samji (born 5 May 1974) is an Indian writer, singer, lyricist, actor, music and film director who works in Hindi cinema. He is known for directing Housefull 4, Bachchhan Paandey, and Kisi Ka Bhai Kisi Ki Jaan independently. He has also made special appearances in films like Baaghi 3 and Coolie No. 1. He is famous for his works with his brother, Sajid Samji. The duo together is known as Sajid - Farhad and are known for directing films like Entertainment and Housefull 3.

Career

Farhad started his career with his brother in 2002 as lyricists. After that they started writing dialogues since Shiva in 2006. Their last movie was Simmba in 2018.In 2019, apart from writing dialogues for Punjabi film Singham, he directed web series Booo Sabki Phategi and the action comedy movie Housefull 4 (starring Akshay Kumar and produced by Sajid Nadiadwala, which was the fourth part of Housefull franchise and became a blockbuster despite of critically negative reviews).

Samji wrote dialogues for the 2020 films Street Dancer 3D, Baaghi 3 and Coolie No. 1. He has completed his next directorial, the Akshay Kumar and Kriti Sanon 2021 starrer Bachchan Pandey, whose shooting took place from January to March 2021. Samji will also make the social family comedy Kisi ka Bhai Kisi ki Jaan starring Salman Khan and Pooja Hegde, which began filming in May 2022 and concluded in December 2022 and will release on Eid 2023.

Filmography

As director

As writer

As actor

As lyricist

As singer

As music composer

Works with Sajid

As lyricist

As writer

As director

Awards and nominations 
 Nominated for Producers Guild Film Awards for Writing Dialogue for the movie Singham (2019 film)

References

External links
 

Indian directors
Indian film award winners
Living people
1974 births
Hindi-language film directors
Indian Muslims
Indian Ismailis
Film directors from Mumbai
Khoja Ismailism
Gujarati people
Gujarati Muslims